Kelly Rowan (born October 26, 1965) is a Canadian film and television actress and former fashion model. A native of Ottawa, Rowan studied acting in London and New York City before working as a model. She was featured in the horror film The Gate (1987) before earning critical acclaim for her performance in the Canadian television film Adrift, for which she won a Gemini Award for Best Actress. After a lead role in Candyman: Farewell to the Flesh (1995), Rowan starred as Mattie Shaw on the series Lonesome Dove: The Outlaw Years (1996–1997).

Rowan went on to garner international fame for her portrayal of California real estate developer Kirsten Cohen on the American television series The O.C., which ran from 2003 to 2007. She had a leading role on the crime series Perception from 2012 to 2015.

Early life
Rowan was born October 26, 1965 in Ottawa, Ontario, and is a graduate of Toronto's Northern Secondary School. She left the University of Western Ontario to pursue acting, and studied at the British American Drama Academy in the United Kingdom and at the Neighborhood Playhouse in New York City. While in New York, Rowan worked as a model to earn a living.

Career
After studying acting and modeling in New York, Rowan went on to appear in films such as The Gate (1987), Hook (1991), Three to Tango (1999), and One Eight Seven (1997).

Rowan guest-starred in television series such as The Outer Limits, Growing Pains, Da Vinci's Inquest, CSI: Crime Scene Investigation and Dallas.  In 1993, she won a Gemini Award for her work in the television movie Adrift.  In 1995–96 she played Matty Shaw, a funeral parlor operator and gun smith, in the TV series Lonesome Dove: The Outlaw Years.  In 2002, Rowan guest-starred in four episodes of Boomtown, playing "Marian", the deceived wife of David McNorris (Neal McDonough). In 2003, she was cast as Kirsten Cohen, a loving mother and businesswoman on Fox's teen drama series The O.C.. In 2006, she won a Prism Award for this role. From 2012 to 2015, she starred as Natalie Vincent in the TNT series, Perception.

Her credits as executive producer include the 2008 television film The Good Times Are Killing Me and the 2007 television film She Drives Me Crazy, which was her third project for Lifetime.

Rowan has volunteered as an actress with the Young Storytellers Foundation.

Personal life
Rowan announced her engagement to David Thomson, 3rd Baron Thomson of Fleet in late June 2007. They broke off their engagement before Rowan, then age 42, gave birth to their daughter on April 28, 2008 in Los Angeles.

Filmography

Film

Television

References

External links

1965 births
20th-century Canadian actresses
21st-century Canadian actresses
Actresses from Ottawa
Female models from Ontario
Canadian film actresses
Canadian television actresses
Living people
Neighborhood Playhouse School of the Theatre alumni
University of Western Ontario alumni
University of California, Los Angeles alumni